Chatterley railway station is a former railway station in Staffordshire, England.

In 1873 the NSR opened the Potteries Loop Line which went much closer to Tunstall town centre. A new station called  was built on the Potteries Loop Line and the existing station renamed Chatterley. For some years the station was referred to in timetables as Chatterley for Tunstall.

The station closed in September 1948 and although the line between Stoke and Macclesfield still exists, the station site is no longer on the route as the line was diverted during the electrification of the West Coast Main Line as the Harecastle railway tunnels were not large enough to accommodate the overhead wires.

References
Notes

Sources
 
 
 

Disused railway stations in Stoke-on-Trent
Former North Staffordshire Railway stations
Railway stations in Great Britain closed in 1948
Railway stations in Great Britain opened in 1864